Palawan Broadcasting Corporation (PBC) is a Philippine media network. Its corporate office is located in Puerto Princesa.

History
PBC was established in 1965 by Ramon Oliveros (Ray Oliver) Decolongon. It launched DYPR, the first local radio station to serve the island of Palawan.

The station faced many difficulties in its early years. Although Palawan could receive some broadcasts from Manila and neighbouring Visayan islands, radio ownership among the 20,000-strong population was not high. The Tinio Electric Plant provided electricity only from 6 a.m. to 6 p.m. and to less than half the population. Then, in 1966, Decolongon was killed in a plane crash: his father, Emilio Decolongon, took over as company president.

In September 1972, martial law was declared throughout the Philippines and all broadcasting stations were shut down, but DYPR was able to reopen fairly quickly after making its case as a provider of essential services. The station had become a part of the communications of the island, broadcasting urgent personal messages—known as Panawagans—as a free service to the community. , radio broadcast languages include Tagalog and Ilocano, and DYPR is affiliated to Radio Mindanao Network, Inc. (RMN).

In 1986, PBC began television broadcasts. The station has been affiliated with ABS-CBN, which provides some television content until the National Telecommunications Commission issued a cease and desist order after the latter failed to obtain a franchise from the Philippine Congress on May 5, 2020.

On March 9, 2021, PBC President Lourdes Ilustre, who was also dubbed as the 'Mother of Broadcast in Palawan,' announced the relaunch of DYPR through a daily newscast program in one local station as a starter. It currently supplied news content and produces morning and afternoon news programs from Monday to Friday initially on DWIZ Palawan of Aliw Broadcasting Corporation from April 2021 to January 2022 and on One FM Palawan of Radio Corporation of the Philippines from January 2022.

PBC Stations

TV stations
TV-7 Puerto Princesa

Translators:
 DYEP-TV 10 Sofronio Española, Palawan
Cable TV Stations in Palawan: 
Calamianes Cable Television, Inc. - Coron, Palawan
Cignal Digital TV - Palawan 
Culion CATV Services, Inc. - Culion, Palawan
Cuyo Cable TV Corporation - Cuyo, Palawan
Destiny Cable - Puerto Princesa City 
Dream Satellite TV - Palawan 
Palawan Cable Television Corporation - Puerto Princesa City
Puerto Princesa CATV, Inc. - Puerto Princesa City 
Roxas Cable Television, Inc. - Roxas, Palawan
Sky Direct - Palawan 
Taytay CATV Service - Taytay, Palawan
Treasure Cable Television, Inc. - Cuyo, Palawan
Vinta Cable Services - Brooke's Point, Palawan
Vinta Cable Services - Narra, Palawan

Radio stations

Former Stations

References

Further reading
 Kapisanan ng mga Brodkaster ng Pilipinas Association of Broadcasters of the Philippines
 DYPR

Radio stations in the Philippines
Television networks in the Philippines
Mass media in Puerto Princesa
Radio stations established in 1965
Television channels and stations established in 1986
Philippine companies established in 1965
Mass media companies established in 1965